Yadamini Narodhama Rupasinghe Gunawardena is a Sri Lankan politician and Member of Parliament.

Gunawardena is the son of Dinesh Gunawardena and grandson of Philip Gunawardena, both government ministers. He is also the grandson of MP Kusumasiri Gunawardena. He completed primary & secondary education at Royal College Colombo. He is a graduate of the University of Wisconsin–Superior (2003) and the University of Wales (2013).

Gunawardena is deputy leader and deputy secretary of the Mahajana Eksath Peramuna. Following the 2020 parliamentary election he was appointed to the Parliament of Sri Lanka as a National List MP representing the Mahajana Eksath Peramuna which is in alliance with Sri Lanka People's Freedom Alliance.

Gunawardena is married to former UPFA Western province councillor Samanmali Sakalasuriya.

References

Alumni of the University of Wales
Living people
Sinhalese politicians
Mahajana Eksath Peramuna politicians
Members of the 16th Parliament of Sri Lanka
Sri Lanka People's Freedom Alliance politicians
University of Wisconsin–Superior alumni
Year of birth missing (living people)